RIKEN cDNA 4933425L06 is a protein that in the house mouse is encoded by the 4933425L06Rik gene.

Model organisms				

Model organisms have been used in the study of 4933425L06Rik function. A conditional knockout mouse line, called 4933425L06Riktm1a(KOMP)Wtsi was generated as part of the International Knockout Mouse Consortium program — a high-throughput mutagenesis project to generate and distribute animal models of disease to interested scientists.

Male and female animals underwent a standardized phenotypic screen to determine the effects of deletion. Twenty three tests were carried out on mutant mice but no significant abnormalities were observed.

References

Further reading 
 

Mouse proteins
Genes mutated in mice